The Clarée is a river in southeastern France, a right tributary to the Durance. Its source is in the Cottian Alps, near Mont Thabor and Valloire. It flows for all of its course in the Hautes-Alpes department. Its confluence with the Durance is near the hamlet of Les Alberts not far from the source of the Durance in the ski resort of Montgenevre.

The upper reaches of the river are in a military exercise range. This is where the French army from their base in Briançon train in the mountains.

Tourism

In the summer the Vallée de la Clarée is visited by cyclists, walkers and horse riders. The river is used for water sports especially in spring as the snow melts. There are sections of white water, which are used by kayaks and white water rafts. There is a dramatic waterfall at Fontcouverte.

Settlements
The settlements along the Clarée include:
 Névache: 
 Plampinet
 Le Serre
 Val-des-Prés
 Le Rosier
 Les Alberts

See also
Vallée de la Clarée

References

Rivers of France
Rivers of Hautes-Alpes
Rivers of Provence-Alpes-Côte d'Azur
Rivers of the Alps